Bertsch is a surname. Notable people with the surname include:

Georg-Christof Bertsch (born 1959)
Marguerite Bertsch (1889–1967), American screenwriter and film director
Matthias Bertsch (born 1966), German-born Austrian musicologist
Mike Bertsch, American ice hockey player and coach
Shane Bertsch (born 1970), American golfer
Tim Bertsch (born 1971), American musical composer and performer

See also
Bertsch-Oceanview, California, a census-designated place in Del Norte County, California, United States

Surnames from given names